Megan Anderson (born 11 February 1990) is an Australian mixed martial artist who competed in the Women's Featherweight division of the Ultimate Fighting Championship (UFC). Anderson also competed for the all women's MMA league Invicta Fighting Championships, where she won the Invicta FC Featherweight Championship.

Early life
Anderson was born and raised on the Gold Coast, Queensland. She attended All Saints Anglican School throughout her upbringing and moved to Canberra at the beginning of 2008 to join the Australian Army upon graduation from high school. After serving two and a half years in the military, she was discharged when it was discovered she had attempted to take her own life and was subsequently hospitalised. She then returned to the Gold Coast and worked as a receptionist while getting involved in the local boxing scene. Through her boxing connections, she was introduced to mixed martial arts and began training in 2013.

Mixed martial arts career

Early career
In November 2013, Anderson made her professional MMA debut, losing to Zoie Shreiweis. Over the next two years, Anderson would build her record to four wins and one loss before signing to Invicta Fighting Championships.

Invicta FC
In her promotional debut in September 2015, Anderson faced Cindy Dandois at Invicta FC 14: Evinger vs. Kianzad. She lost the fight by submission (triangle choke). Anderson then proceeded to gain three wins in the promotion.

Invicta FC Featherweight Championship
On 14 January 2017, Anderson faced Charmaine Tweet for the Interim Invicta FC Featherweight Championship at Invicta FC 21. She won the fight by TKO in the second round. Anderson was later promoted from Interim to undisputed Featherweight Champion after Cris Cyborg vacated her belt.

After the UFC opted against signing Anderson, Anderson was scheduled to defend her undisputed title against Helena Kolesnyk at Invicta FC 24, on 15 July 2017, but the fight never took place as Anderson was later signed by the UFC.

Ultimate Fighting Championship 
Anderson was scheduled to make her promotional debut against Cris Cyborg at UFC 214 on 29 July 2017. However, Anderson pulled out of the bout on 27 June, citing "personal issues" as the reason. She was replaced by Tonya Evinger.

Anderson faced Holly Holm on 9 June 2018 at UFC 225. She lost the fight via unanimous decision.

Anderson faced Cat Zingano on 29 December 2018 at UFC 232. She won the fight via technical knockout early in the first round after a kick to Zingano caused an eye injury that didn't allow her to continue.

Anderson faced promotional newcomer Felicia Spencer on 18 May 2019 at UFC Fight Night 152. She lost the fight via submission in the first round.

Anderson faced  Zarah Fairn Dos Santos on 6 October 2019 at UFC 243. She won the fight via a submission in round one.

Anderson faced Norma Dumont Viana on 29 February 2020 at UFC Fight Night 169. She won the fight via knockout in round one. This win earned her the Performance of the Night award.

Anderson was scheduled to face Amanda Nunes on 12 December 2020 for the UFC Women's Featherweight Championship at UFC 256. However, it was announced on 9 November that Nunes pulled out due to an undisclosed injury and the bout was postponed to 2021. The pairing was rescheduled for 6 March 2021 at UFC 259. She lost the fight via a triangle armbar in round one.

The title fight was the last fight of her prevailing six-fight contract and the organisation opted not to renew it, making her a free agent.

In February 2022, Anderson posted in her social media that she is no longer pursuing fights, and is not affiliated with any teams or organizations.

Championships and accomplishments

Mixed martial arts
Ultimate Fighting Championship
Performance of the Night (One time) 
Tied (with Felicia Spencer) for most fights in UFC Women's Featherweight division (six)
Tied (with Felicia Spencer) for most stoppage victories in UFC Women's Featherweight division (three)
Tied (with Cris Cyborg and Felicia Spencer) for most knockouts in UFC Women's Featherweight division (two)

Invicta Fighting Championships
Invicta FC Featherweight World Championship (one time; former)
Interim Invicta FC Featherweight World Championship (one time; former)
Performance of the Night (three times) vs. Amanda Bell, Peggy Morgan and Charmaine Tweet
Fight of the Night (one time) vs. Amber Leibrock

Reality show

Mixed martial arts record

|-
|Loss
|align=center|11–5
|Amanda Nunes
|Submission (reverse triangle armbar)
|UFC 259
|
|align=center|1
|align=center|2:03
|Las Vegas, Nevada, United States
|
|-
|Win
|align=center|11–4
|Norma Dumont
|KO (punch)
|UFC Fight Night: Benavidez vs. Figueiredo 
|
|align=center|1
|align=center|3:31
|Norfolk, Virginia, United States
|
|-
|Win
|align=center|10–4
|Zarah Fairn Dos Santos
|Submission (triangle choke)
|UFC 243 
|
|align=center|1
|align=center|3:57
|Melbourne, Victoria, Australia
|
|-
|Loss
|align=center|9–4
|Felicia Spencer
|Submission (rear-naked choke)
|UFC Fight Night: dos Anjos vs. Lee 
|
|align=center|1
|align=center|3:24
|Rochester, New York, United States
|
|-
|Win
|align=center|9–3
|Cat Zingano
|TKO (eye injury)
|UFC 232 
|
|align=center|1
|align=center|1:01
|Inglewood, California, United States 
|
|-
|Loss
|align=center| 8–3
|Holly Holm
|Decision (unanimous)
|UFC 225 
|
|align=center|3
|align=center|5:00
|Chicago, Illinois, United States
|
|-
| Win
| align=center| 8–2
| Charmaine Tweet
| TKO (punches and head kick)
| Invicta FC 21: Anderson vs. Tweet
| 
| align=center| 2
| align=center| 2:05
| Kansas City, Missouri, United States
| 
|-
| Win
| align=center| 7–2
| Peggy Morgan
| TKO (punches)
| Invicta FC 18: Grasso vs. Esquibel
| 
| align=center| 1
| align=center| 4:09
| Kansas City, Missouri, United States
| 
|-
| Win
| align=center| 6–2
| Amanda Bell
| TKO (head kick and punches)
| Invicta FC 17: Evinger vs. Schneider
| 
| align=center| 1
| align=center| 5:00
| Costa Mesa, California, United States
| 
|-
| Win
| align=center| 5–2
| Amber Leibrock
| TKO (knees and punches)
| Invicta FC 15: Cyborg vs. Ibragimova
| 
| align=center| 3
| align=center| 2:33
| Costa Mesa, California, United States
| 
|-
| Loss
| align=center| 4–2
| Cindy Dandois
| Submission (triangle choke)
| Invicta FC 14: Evinger vs. Kianzad
| 
| align=center| 2
| align=center| 2:41
| Kansas City, Missouri, United States
| 
|-
| Win
| align=center| 4–1
| Zoie Shreiweis
| Submission (armbar)
| Roshambo MMA 4
| 
| align=center| 1
| align=center| 1:32
| Brisbane, Queensland, Australia
|
|-
| Win
| align=center| 3–1
| Jodie Struzik
| Submission (rear-naked choke)
| Nitro MMA 12
| 
| align=center| 2
| align=center| 0:30
| Logan City, Queensland, Australia
| 
|-
| Win
| align=center| 2–1
| Kerry Barrett
| Decision (majority)
| Roshambo MMA 3
| 
| align=center| 3
| align=center| 3:00
| Brisbane, Queensland, Australia
| 
|-
| Win
| align=center| 1–1
| Janay Harding
| Decision (unanimous)
| FightWorld Cup 17
| 
| align=center| 3
| align=center| 3:00
| Gold Coast, Queensland, Australia
| 
|-
| Loss
| align=center| 0–1
| Zoie Shreiweis
| Decision (majority)
| FightWorld Cup 16
| 
| align=center| 3
| align=center| 3:00
| Gold Coast, Queensland, Australia
|
|-

References

External links
 
 

1990 births
Mixed martial artists from the Gold Coast
Living people
Australian practitioners of Brazilian jiu-jitsu
Female Brazilian jiu-jitsu practitioners
Australian female mixed martial artists
Featherweight mixed martial artists
Mixed martial artists utilizing boxing
Mixed martial artists utilizing Muay Thai
Mixed martial artists utilizing Brazilian jiu-jitsu
Australian Muay Thai practitioners
Female Muay Thai practitioners
Australian soldiers
Ultimate Fighting Championship female fighters